Sporting events called the European Open include:

Disc Golf European Open, a PDGA major disc golf tournament
European Open (golf), a golf tournament on the European Tour
Ladies European Open (golf), Ladies European Tour
Colgate European Open (golf), LPGA tour, women's golf tournament
European Open (judo), European judo tournament
European Open (snooker), a professional snooker tournament
European Open (tennis), a 250 Series ATP tournament starting in 2016 in Belgium
WTA Swiss Open (tennis), a defunct WTA tennis tournament, in its latter years it was titled as the European Open

See also

 Hamburg European Open (formerly German Open) ATP men's tennis
 
 Euroformula Open Championship (motorsports)
 European Championship (disambiguation)
 European Masters (disambiguation)
 Open Europe (disambiguation)